The Ministry of Public Health of North Korea is a  central administrative agency of the Cabinet of the Democratic People's Republic of Korea. It was founded on September 2, 1948, when the Cabinet of North Korea was established. Since January 2021, the Minister of Public Health is Choe Kyong-Chol.

The Ministry operates the Pugang Pharmaceutic Company.

Former ministers
Li Pyong-nam September 2, 1948 ~ November 30, 1948 Dec. 1, 1948-Sep. 30, 1949, October 1, 1949 ~ September 20, 1957, September 20, 1957 ~ December 1958, July 6, 1959 ~ 1960
Choi Chang-seok October 23, 1962 ~
Li Lakbin December 16, 1967 ~ December 27, 1967 General Manager, December 28, 1967 ~ 1972, General Manager December 15, 1977 to 1980, 
Myung-Bin Park, General Manager, 1980 ~ April 4, 1982, General Manager, April 5, 1982 ~ December 28, 1986, General Manager
Lee Jong-yul December 29, 1986 ~, Manager, May 24, 1990 ~, Manager
Kim Soo-hak September 1, 1998 ~ October 2006
Choi Chang-sik: October 2006 ~ April 2013
Kang Ha-guk: April 2013 ~ 2017
Jang Jun-sang: 2017 ~ 2019
O Chun-bok: 2019- 2021
Choe Kyong-chol: January 18, 2021 - present

References

External links

Cabinet of North Korea
Health ministries